Hush is a 1921 American silent drama film directed by Harry Garson and starring Clara Kimball Young, J. Frank Glendon and Kathlyn Williams.

Cast
 Clara Kimball Young as 	Vera Stanford
 J. Frank Glendon as 	Jack Stanford
 Kathlyn Williams as 	Isabel Dane
 Jack Pratt as Hugh Graham
 Bertram Grassby as Herbert Brooks
 Gerard Alexander as Grace Brooks
 Beatrice La Plante as 	Maid
 John Underhill as 	Butler

References

Bibliography
 Connelly, Robert B. The Silents: Silent Feature Films, 1910-36, Volume 40, Issue 2. December Press, 1998.
 Munden, Kenneth White. The American Film Institute Catalog of Motion Pictures Produced in the United States, Part 1. University of California Press, 1997.

External links
 

1921 films
1921 drama films
1920s English-language films
American silent feature films
Silent American drama films
American black-and-white films
Films directed by Harry Garson
1920s American films